Master Kong is a Chinese restaurant with two locations in Portland, Oregon.

Description

Master Kong serves Chinese cuisine at two locations in southeast Portland. The original 35-seat restaurant operates in a house on Division Street in the Montavilla neighborhood, and a second location on 32nd Avenue operates in the Richmond neighborhood. The menu has included buns, congee, dumplings, and jianbing.

History
The original restaurant opened in March 2018. The second location opened in early November 2022.

Reception

In 2018, Master Kong was named Willamette Week Newcomer of the Year, and was nominated for Restaurant of the Year by Eater Portland Eater Awards. Michael Russell included Master Kong in The Oregonian 2018 list of Portland's 10 best new restaurants, as well as the newspaper's 2019 and 2020 lists of the city's 40 best inexpensive restaurants.

See also

 List of Chinese restaurants

References

External links

 

2018 establishments in Oregon
Chinese restaurants in Portland, Oregon
Montavilla, Portland, Oregon
Restaurants established in 2018
Richmond, Portland, Oregon